The Finland women's national under-16 basketball team is a national women's basketball team of Finland, administered by the Basketball Finland. It represents the country in women's international under-16 basketball competitions.

FIBA U16 Women's European Championship participations

See also
Finland women's national basketball team
Finland women's national under-18 basketball team
Finland men's national under-17 basketball team

References

External links
Archived records of Finland team participations

Basketball teams in Finland
Women's basketball in Finland
Women's national under-16 basketball teams
Basketball